Ksebki  is a village in the administrative district of Gmina Turośl, within the Kolno County, Podlaskie Voivodeship, in north-eastern Poland.

The village has a population of 538.

References

Ksebki